Eel River Bar First Nation, or Ugpi'ganjig is a Mi'gmaq First Nation located in Northern New Brunswick. It has a registered population of 757 people, of which 346 live on reserve. The total number of people living on the reserve is 415 as of 2016.

Location 
Eel River Bar is situated on the Bay of Chaleur at the mouth of the Eel River, in Northern New Brunswick. It is approximately 3 km from Dalhousie, and about 20 km from Campbellton, the nearest city. Route 11 is the nearest highway, and Route 134 is a secondary road running through the community.

References 

Indian reserves in New Brunswick
Mi'kmaq in Canada